Gervasio Antonio de Posadas y Dávila (18 June 1757, in Buenos Aires – 2 July 1833, in Buenos Aires) was a member of Argentina's Second Triumvirate from 19 August 1813 to 31 January 1814, after which he served as Supreme Director until 9 January 1815.

Posadas' early studies were at the convent of San Francisco. Then he studied and practiced law with Manuel José de Labardén. In 1789 Posadas was appointed notary general for the bishopric, and held that post until the events of the May Revolution. He was unaware of the impending revolution and was caught by surprise when the Buenos Aires Cabildo (town hall) was occupied on 25 May 1810; he did not agree that it had been legitimately done. His donations to the Sociedad Patriótica made him an associate of the Saavedrist faction, so the leaders of the riots of 5 April 1811 exiled him to Mendoza. A month later he was appointed solicitor-procurator for the City of Buenos aires.

Like many other nineteenth century Argentines prominent in public life, Posadas was a freemason.

The Second Triumvirate commissioned Posadas, Nicolás Rodríguez Peña and Juan Larrea to draft a Constitution for consideration by the Asamblea del Año XIII, then he became part of the Triumvirate when the Assembly granted Executive Power to the Triumvirate. Then on 22 January 1814 the same Assembly decided to concentrate the Executive Power in him as a Supreme Director for the United Provinces, and so he took that office for a one-year period. During his rule, Saavedra and Campana were exiled, Montevideo fell to the United Provinces but serious problems arose with José Gervasio Artigas and the Liga Federal on the Banda Oriental. Moreover, Ferdinand VII of Spain regained his throne in 1815.

Posadas was succeeded in office by his nephew, Carlos María de Alvear, who was removed soon afterwards by a military coup d'état. By August 1815 the whole Alvearista faction was in disgrace and Posadas was jailed. The former Supreme Director spent the next six years in 22 different jails. He began writing his memoirs in 1829.

Notes

References

1757 births
1833 deaths
Lawyers from Buenos Aires
19th-century Argentine lawyers
Supreme Directors of the United Provinces of the Río de la Plata
Members of Argentine triumvirates
 Argentine Freemasons
18th-century Argentine lawyers